The East African red-finned barb (Enteromius apleurogramma) is a species of ray-finned fish in the  family Cyprinidae.

It is found in Burundi, Kenya, Rwanda, and Tanzania.

Its natural habitats are rivers, swamps, freshwater lakes, freshwater marshes, and inland deltas.

It is not considered a threatened species by the IUCN.

References 

 Ntakimazi, G., Twongo, T.K. & Hanssens, M. 2005.  Barbus apleurogramma.   2006 IUCN Red List of Threatened Species.   Downloaded on 19 July 2007.

Enteromius
Freshwater fish of Kenya
Freshwater fish of Tanzania
Taxa named by George Albert Boulenger
Fish described in 1911
Taxonomy articles created by Polbot